Paweł Sobczak (born June 4, 1969 in Lubraniec, Kuyavian-Pomeranian) is a retired field hockey goalkeeper from Poland, who was a member of the Men's National Team that ended up in twelfth and last place at the 2000 Summer Olympics in Sydney. The team had qualified by surprise for the Games by defeating bigger names like New Zealand at the 2000 Men's Field Hockey Olympic Qualifier in Osaka, Japan.

References
 sports-reference

External links

1969 births
Living people
Polish male field hockey players
Male field hockey goalkeepers
Olympic field hockey players of Poland
Field hockey players at the 2000 Summer Olympics
1998 Men's Hockey World Cup players
People from Włocławek County
Sportspeople from Kuyavian-Pomeranian Voivodeship